Dyssochroma is a genus of flowering plants belonging to the family Solanaceae.

Its native range is Eastern and Southern Brazil.

Species:

Dyssochroma atlantica 
Dyssochroma longipes 
Dyssochroma viridiflorum

References

Solanaceae
Solanaceae genera